Ancylocera michelbacheri is a species of beetle in the family Cerambycidae. It was described by Chemsak in 1963.

References

Ancylocera
Beetles described in 1963